Pavel Sedláček (born April 5, 1968 in Moravská Třebová) is a retired male hammer thrower from the Czech Republic, who competed at three consecutive Summer Olympics, starting in 1992 (Barcelona, Spain). He set his personal best (79.56 metres) on September 8, 1996 at a meet in Prague.

Achievements

References
 
 sports-reference
 Profile

1968 births
Living people
Czech male hammer throwers
Athletes (track and field) at the 1992 Summer Olympics
Athletes (track and field) at the 1996 Summer Olympics
Athletes (track and field) at the 2000 Summer Olympics
Olympic athletes of Czechoslovakia
Olympic athletes of the Czech Republic